The cinema of Malaysia consists of feature films produced in Malaysia, shot in the languages Malay, Mandarin, Cantonese, Tamil, various indigenous languages, and English.

Malaysia produces about 60 feature films annually, and between 300–400 television dramas and serials a year apart from the in-house productions by the individual television stations. The country also holds its own annual national level film awards, known as the Malaysia Film Festival. There are about 150 cinemas and cineplexes in Malaysia, showing not only local films but also foreign films. Foreign film producers are welcome to shoot on location in Malaysia, undertake film co-production ventures so that local artistes and technicians have the opportunity of gaining exposure and experience. 

Currently, there are some internationally famous Malaysian actors such as Academy Award winner Michelle Yeoh and Henry Golding.

Early films, 1933–41
Malaysian cinema began in 1933 with Leila Majnun, based on a classical Persian story of two ill-fated lovers. Directed by B.S. Rajhans and produced by the Singapore-based Motilal Chemical Company of Bombay, the cast was derived from a local opera group. Observing the success of this project, two brothers, Run Run and Run Me Shaw, were prompted in 1937 to import some equipment from Shanghai and start the production of Malay films from their small studio at Ampas Road in Singapore. However, they only managed to produce five or six movies prior to the Japanese invasion in 1941.

Under Japanese colonial rule, 1941–45
In 1941, when the Japanese occupied Malaya, the first Japanese film companies found local film production to be extremely limited. The exhibition market was dominated by overseas Chinese companies, namely, the Shaw Brothers. The Japanese would later use Malaya for exactly the same purposes, even obtaining the help of the Shaws to break into their extensive Southeast Asian film exhibition network. Although Malaya never became a major film production center under the Japanese, it was a strategically important film market for Japan and a convenient outpost for moving films into and out of Southeast Asia.

The Japanese film studios shot a number of films in Shonan (what the Japanese renamed Singapore during the occupation) depicting the area in similar ways to the Japanese frontier. Films such as Southern Winds II (続・南の風, 1942, Shochiku Studios), Tiger of Malay (マライの虎, 1942, Daiei Studios) or Singapore All-Out Attack (シンガポール総攻撃, 1943, Daiei Studios) presented the area as an exotic land rich in resources, occupied by simple but honest people.  Japanese colonial films also associated the region with sex as many 'Karayuki-san', or prostitutes, had been either sold to brothels or chosen to go to Southeast Asia to earn money around the turn of the century. Karayuki-san (からゆきさん, 1937, Toho Studios), Kinoshita Keisuke's Flowering Port (花咲く港, 1943, Shochiku Studios), and later, Imamura Shohei's Whoremonger (女衒, 1987, Toei Studios), which were all or at least partly shot on location, are examples of the extent to which this subgenre dominates the representations of Malaya in Japanese cinema.

Development and decline, 1945–75
Following the end of World War II in 1945, the Shaw Brothers resumed production in 1947 with a Rajhans-directed film called Singapura Di Waktu Malam (Singapore by Night) starring Siput Sarawak. Backed by their chain of theatres, which they either owned or rented, the film enjoyed a good response. The Shaw Brothers proceeded to produce more films and introduced new faces, including the Sumatran-born Kasma Booty. Her first film, Cempaka, revolved around the life of a native island girl.

In 1948, P. Ramlee - who later became one of the foremost figures in Malay cinema, made his debut in the film Cinta (Love). Ramlee’s talents in music composing and singing brought him prominence. He was very versatile as a leading actor, a comic, dramatic artiste, scriptwriter and film director. Most of his early films carried plenty of singing and dancing scenes, a trend introduced by Indian film directors. After Rajhans, Shaw Brothers imported many other Indian film directors, among them S. Ramanathan, K.R. Seetharama Sastry, Phani Majumdar and D. Ghoss. There were also some local film directors such as L. Krishnan and K. M. Bashker who learned the trade and techniques through experience and apprenticeship. By the 1960s, many of the expatriates were replaced by local directors.

The success enjoyed by the Shaw Brother’s film studio, known as the Malay Film Productions (MFP), encouraged a few other entrepreneurs to venture into the same business, as was the case with the Nusantara film company, started in 1951 by Hsu Chiu Meng. However, he depended heavily on independent theatres, and after producing about a dozen films, Nusantara closed down in 1954.

In 1952, Ho Ah Loke opened a studio on Tampines Road, Singapore, calling his company Rimau Film Productions, later to be known as Keris Film Productions. Ho owned a few small theatres through his earlier venture as a film distributor. He managed to produce a number of films, and in 1956 merged with Cathay Organisation, owned by millionaire Loke Wan Tho. The company was renamed Cathy-Keris Film Productions with its studio on East Coast Road, Singapore. Supported by their own theatre chain throughout Malaya and Singapore, Cathay-Keris films posed a challenge to the films produced by Shaw’s MFP studios. Shaw studios produced about ten films a year, while Cathay-Keris too produced about the same number.

During those early years, all the films were in black and white. The studios had their own laboratories, recording and editing facilities. Direct sound recording was the practice from the beginning, until the advent of the 1960s. Then, post-synching or dubbing systems appeared and are still in use today.

Screenplays were mostly based on folk tales, stage plays, and legends of fictional or real historical heroes or events. MFP made Hang Tuah in 1956, about the legendary Melaka warrior Hang Tuah who lived during the heyday of the Melaka Sultanate. It was done in Eastman Color and directed by Indian Phani Majumdar, who was specially brought in to ensure that the film made it to the East Asia Film Festival. P. Ramlee acted as Hang Tuah and also composed the background music, for which the film won an award. In response, Cathay-Keris produced Hang Jebat, about Hang Tuah’s closest friend who becomes involved in a life-or-death struggle with him.

Just before they ceased operations, both MFP and Cathay-Keris produced three colour films each. Shaw Brothers’ produced Ribut (Storm), Hang Tuah and Raja Bersiong (The Fanged King). The latter, a legend from the state of Kedah, was written by Malaysia’s first Prime Minister, the late Tunku Abdul Rahman. Cathay-Keris produced Buluh Perindu (The Magic Flute), Cinta Gadis Rimba (The Virgin Of Borneo) and Mahsuri (The Maid of Langkawi), another Kedah legend written by Tunku Abdul Rahman.

Although many companies emerged, such as Nusantara Films, Tan & Wong Film Company, Rimau Productions and Cathay-Keris, many closed down due to escalating production costs and diminishing audiences, leaving only MFP and Cathay-Keris both operating in Singapore.

In 1961, H.M. Shah bought over a piece of prime land on the fringe of Kuala Lumpur and turned it into Merdeka Studio. It had a meager beginning, but once the top stars started their exodus from the two Singapore studios, its growth surged dramatically. Located adjacent to the National Zoo on Hulu Kelang Road, it is 13 kilometres from the city. Today, it is the headquarters of the National Film Development Corporation, Malaysia (FINAS). The Shaw Brothers dispatched some of their Singapore film directors, among them L. Krishnan, P. Ramlee, Salleh Ghani, Jamil Sulong, Omer Rojik, S. Kadarisman, Sudarmaji, Naz Achnas, M. Amin and Jins Shamsuddin, to make films at Merdeka.

Renaissance, 1975–present
In 1975, a renaissance prompted a revitalised growth when Sabah Films grossed huge profits with its maiden offering, Keluarga Comat (Comat’s Family). Soon, other companies mushroomed, such as Perfima, Syed Kechik, Indra, Jins Shamsuddin, and others.

The 1980s saw numerous changes. A vital one was the setting up FINAS in 1981 to develop and stimulate the growth and maintain the standards of the film industry by various means, including the provision of research and advisory services. FINAS has since set up numerous facilities to promote the industry, including a credit facility scheme which enables young  film-makers to test their potential. The revival in the industry also made changes to certain formats of the local film productions. Nearly all the films were made in colour, some using the scope format and some the standard format. There were no fixed salaries for artists attached to a certain company or studio. A company can only do two of three functions: production, distribution or exhibition, to avoid a monopoly by a certain party. The producers also might be able to recover part of their investment by the return of the entertainment tax as a way of incentive. A further incentive to local film-makers is that they are invited to make television programmes either in film format or video format. As a result, there are now more than 300 film companies registered with FINAS.

In 1989 and 1990, over 20 feature films were produced, a number that decreased to 15 in 1995, but still more than the five feature films made in 1985. In the mid-2000s, Malaysian film industry saw an increase in number of domestic film production, from only seven films in 1999, to 26 films in 2009. The increase of domestic film production is because of new opening of cinemas and limitations on the screening of foreign films in local cinemas. Currently, the Malaysian film industry faces competition from surrounding regional cinemas such as those from Indonesia, Thailand, the Philippines and India.

In 2007, Tan Chui Mui's Love Conquers All won a Tiger Award at the 36th International Film Festival Rotterdam. In 2008, Liew Seng Tat's Flower in the Pocket also won a Tiger Award at the 37th International Film Festival Rotterdam. In 2011, over 40 films were released in Malaysia. In 2012, FINAS cooperated with Skim Wajib Tayang to allow 2 local films to be screened at local cinemas every week, effective on 24 May, to solve the delay of screening faced by local film industry. As such, in 2012, 70 films queued up to be shown in Malaysia nationwide.

During the global pandemic, cinemas were closed for up to a year beginning around March 2020 till late September 2021. In the July 2022, the resurgence of cinema attendance was evidence by the high attendance for Mat Kilau: Kebangkitan Pahlawan ('Mat Kilau: The Rise of a Warrior') directed by Syamsul Yusof, in which he was reported to claim 'earned RM53mil in 13 days', thus earning the historical epic as the highest grossing Malaysian film of all-time.

Category 18+ films

At the beginning of Malaysian film industry, while watching movies, there were no age restrictions, and films were done under strict guidelines. For instance, no sex scenes and crimes were permitted. Malaysian film classification was introduced in 1996 to provide parents of minors a chance to prevent their children from being exposed to inappropriate materials. There are four 18+ categories used in Malaysia, unlike other countries, which only used one classification for each age. These are 18PA, 18PL, 18SG and 18SX, however, 18PA is rarely used. Movies prior to 1996 also carry ratings, and some of the local movies prior to 1996 later carry 18+ ratings, for example, Mekanik (1983) (later rated 18SX) and Pelumba Malam (1989) (later rated 18PL). Two of the earlier local movies with 18+ ratings since its introduction, Litar Kasih (1996) and Panas (1998), were both classified 18SX. However, these movies still enjoyed surprising box office successes in Malaysia.

Non-Malay language cinema

Malaysian films are also produced in Tamil and Mandarin. A Malaysian Tamil film titled Jagat won the best Malaysian film in 2016.

New Films Classification

On 29 March 2012, the Film Censorship Board of Malaysia released new colour-coded logo designs for cinema films' classification. U or 'Umum' is now blue, which meant that the film can be watched by all ages and consists of what the Board deems positive depictions of values. P13 or 'Penjaga 13' is yellow, which signifies that caution should be taken when watching the film as it is not suitable for individuals below 13 and any viewers of that age must be guided by a parent or guardian. 18 is red, which meant that the film is only suitable for viewers aged 18 and above as it contains images of violence, horror and sex, as well as religious, political and social elements. All those changes are effective starting 1 April 2012.

Top 10 highest-grossing Malaysia film of all time (as of September 2022)

All languages

 Vedigundu Pasangge earned £222 on the first day and lifetime collection of £291 in the United Kingdom. It was the highest opening collection for a movie from Malaysia in the United Kingdom and overseas box office.

Mandarin language

Tamil language

Further reading
 Millet, Raphaël (2006) Singapore Cinema. Singapore: Editions Didier Millet 
 McKay, Benjamin  (13 October 2005). "A Conversation with Amir Muhammad" . Criticine.
 Ku Seman Ku Hussein. Mengimbas filem Melayu abad 20 // Massa, 218: 57; 4 Dis. 1999.
 Van der Heide, William (2002) Malaysian Cinema, Asian Film: Border Crossing and National Cultures. Amsterdam: University of Amsterdam Press.

See also
 Malaysian Tamil Cinema, Tamil language movie from Malaysia
 Cinema of the world
 World cinema
 Asian cinema
 Southeast Asian cinema
 East Asian cinema
 List of cinemas in Malaysia

References

External links
 Criticine Malaysia  - Malaysia page of Southeast Asian Cinema journal
 A-Z of Malaysian film posters